Joaquin Yuconri Buckley (born April 27, 1994) is an American mixed martial artist who competes in the Middleweight  division of the Ultimate Fighting Championship. A professional competitor since 2014, he has also formerly competed for Bellator MMA and Legacy Fighting Alliance.

Background
Buckley was born and grew up in St. Louis, Missouri. His father never in the picture, Joaquin and his mother lived in his grandmother's house for the most part of his youth. Joaquin's mother passed away due to a heart condition when he was in the sixth grade. He started wrestling in Marquette High School, growing interested in mixed martial arts and eventually started training in it after graduating.

Mixed martial arts career

Early career

Starting his professional career in 2014, Buckley compiled a 10–2 record fighting for Shamrock FC, Bellator MMA, and Legacy Fighting Alliance. During that time, he most notably faced Logan Storley on April 13, 2018, at Bellator 197. He lost the fight by unanimous decision. After two straight TKO wins in LFA, Buckley was signed to the UFC.

Ultimate Fighting Championship

Buckley made his UFC debut against Kevin Holland on August 8, 2020 at UFC Fight Night 174, just one week after picking up a win in LFA. He lost the fight via technical knockout in round three.

A middleweight bout between Abu Azaitar and Joaquin Buckley was expected to take place on October 11, 2020, at UFC Fight Night: Moraes vs. Sandhagen. However, Azaitar pulled out on September 26 due to undisclosed reasons and was replaced by Impa Kasanganay. He won the bout via knockout in two in highlight reel fashion, delivering a jumping spinning back kick after Kasangany had caught one of his kicks, knocking him out cold. For this knockout, Buckley not only earned the Performance of the Night bonus, but the video of his knockout win went viral on the internet. The UFC tweet with the video was the most-liked (359,000), most-retweeted (143,000), and most-viewed (12.8 million) tweet in UFC history. The knockout became the UFC's most-watched Instagram video ever with over 17.8 million views. Across three tweets, three Instagram posts, four Facebook posts, and a TikTok video, the Buckley knockout video has generated more than 65 million views and 83 million impressions for the UFC. Rapper Kanye West even used the footage of the knockout to promote the release of a new song.

In a quick return to the Octagon, Buckley faced Jordan Wright at UFC 255 on November 21, 2020. He won the fight via knockout in round two. This win earned him the Performance of the Night award.

Buckley faced Alessio Di Chirico on January 16, 2021 at UFC on ABC 1. He lost the fight in the first round via a head kick knockout.

Buckley faced Antônio Arroyo on September 18, 2021 at UFC Fight Night: Smith vs. Spann. He won the fight via knockout in round three.  This win earned him the Performance of the Night award.

Buckley was scheduled to face Abdul Razak Alhassan on January 15, 2022 at UFC on ESPN 32. However, the pairing was cancelled after Alhassan withdrew for undisclosed reasons  and the pair was rescheduled to UFC Fight Night 201. Buckley won the fight via split decision.

Buckley was scheduled to face Abusupiyan Magomedov on June 4, 2022 at UFC Fight Night 207. However, the bout was cancelled for unknown reasons.

Buckley faced Albert Duraev on June 18, 2022 at UFC on ESPN 37. He won the fight via TKO before the third round after the ringside doctor stopped the fight due to Duraev's eye swelling shut. This win earned him his fourth Performance of the Night award.

Buckley faced Nassourdine Imavov on September 3, 2022 at UFC Fight Night 209. He lost the fight via unanimous decision.

Buckley faced Chris Curtis  on December 10, 2022 at UFC 282. He lost the fight via technical knockout in round two.

Championships and accomplishments
Ultimate Fighting Championship 
 Performance of the Night (Four times) 
2020 Knockout of the Year  vs. Impa Kasanganay
2020 UFC President's Choice Performance of the Year vs. Impa Kasanganay
2020 UFC Honors Knockout of the Year vs. Impa Kasanganay
MMAjunkie.com
2020 October Knockout of the Month vs. Impa Kasanganay
2020 Knockout of the Year vs. Impa Kasanganay
MMA Fighting, Bleacher Report, MMA Mania, CombatPress.com, Cageside Press, BT Sport, Sherdog, MMA Weekly
2020 Knockout of the Year vs. Impa Kasanganay
World MMA Awards
2021 Knockout of the Year vs. Impa Kasanganay at UFC Fight Night: Moraes vs. Sandhagen
Voting period for 2021 awards ran through July 2020 to July 2021 due to the COVID-19 pandemic.

Mixed martial arts record

|- 
|Loss
|align=center|15–6
|Chris Curtis
|KO (punches)
|UFC 282
|
|align=center|2
|align=center|2:49
|Las Vegas, Nevada, United States
|
|-
|Loss
|align=center|15–5
|Nassourdine Imavov
|Decision (unanimous)
|UFC Fight Night: Gane vs. Tuivasa
|
|align=center|3
|align=center|5:00
|Paris, France
|
|-
|Win
|align=center|15–4
|Albert Duraev
|TKO (doctor stoppage)
|UFC on ESPN: Kattar vs. Emmett
|
|align=center|2
|align=center|5:00
|Austin, Texas, United States
|
|-
|Win
|align=center|14–4
|Abdul Razak Alhassan
|Decision (split)
|UFC Fight Night: Walker vs. Hill
|
|align=center|3
|align=center|5:00
|Las Vegas, Nevada, United States
|
|-
|Win
|align=center|13–4
|Antônio Arroyo
|KO (punches)
|UFC Fight Night: Smith vs. Spann
|
|align=center|3
|align=center|2:26
|Las Vegas, Nevada, United States
|
|-
|Loss
|align=center|12–4
|Alessio Di Chirico
|KO (head kick)
|UFC on ABC: Holloway vs. Kattar
|
|align=center|1
|align=center|2:12
|Abu Dhabi, United Arab Emirates
|
|-
|Win
|align=center|12–3
|Jordan Wright
|KO (punches)
|UFC 255
|
|align=center|2
|align=center|0:18
|Las Vegas, Nevada, United States
|
|-
|Win
|align=center|11–3
|Impa Kasanganay
|KO (spinning back kick)
|UFC Fight Night: Moraes vs. Sandhagen
|
|align=center|2
|align=center|2:03
|Abu Dhabi, United Arab Emirates
|
|-
|Loss
|align=center|10–3
|Kevin Holland
|TKO (punch)
|UFC Fight Night: Lewis vs. Oleinik
|
|align=center|3
|align=center|0:32
|Las Vegas, Nevada, United States
|
|-
| Win
| align=center| 10–2
| Jackie Gosh
| TKO (punches)
| LFA 87
| 
| align=center| 2
| align=center| 1:47
| Sioux Falls, South Dakota, United States
|
|-
| Win
| align=center|9–2
| Chris Harris
|TKO (punches)
| LFA 76
| 
| align=center|1
| align=center|1:08
| Park City, Kansas, United States
|
|-
| Loss
| align=center|8–2
| Logan Storley
|Decision (unanimous)
|Bellator 197
|
|align=center|3
|align=center|5:00
|St. Charles, Missouri, United States
|
|-
|Win
|align=center|8–1
|Vinicius de Jesus
|Decision (split)
|Bellator 185
|
|align=center|3
|align=center|5:00
|Uncasville, Connecticut, United States
|
|-
| Win
| align=center|7–1
| Justin Patterson
| Decision (unanimous)
|Bellator 175
|
|align=center|3
|align=center|5:00
|Rosemont, Illinois, United States
|
|-
| Loss
| align=center| 6–1
| Jackie Gosh
| TKO (punches)
|Bellator 164
|
|align=center|2
|align=center|2:44
|Tel Aviv, Israel
| 
|-
| Win
| align=center| 6–0
| Chris Heatherly
| KO (knee)
| Bellator 157: Dynamite 2
| 
| align=center| 2
| align=center| 4:14
| St. Louis, Missouri, United States
| 
|-
| Win
| align=center| 5–0
| Kyle Kurtz
| TKO (knee and punches)
| Shamrock FC: Fuel
| 
| align=center| 1
| align=center| 4:34
| St. Louis, Missouri, United States
| 
|-
| Win
| align=center| 4–0
| Stacy Bacon
| Decision (unanimous)
| Shamrock FC: Throwdown
| 
| align=center| 3
| align=center| 5:00
|St. Louis, Missouri, United States
| 
|-
| Win
| align=center| 3–0
| Kalel Robinson
| TKO (punches)
| Shamrock FC: Showdown
| 
| align=center| 3
| align=center| 4:01
| St. Louis, Missouri, United States
| 
|-
| Win
| align=center| 2–0
| Bryant West
| TKO (punches)
| Shamrock FC: Xtreme Fight Night 2
| 
| align=center| 1
| align=center| 2:28
| St. Louis, Missouri, United States
|
|-
| Win
| align=center| 1–0
| Wesley Sullivan
| TKO (punches)
| Shamrock FC: Nemesis
| 
| align=center| 1
| align=center| 3:46
| St. Louis, Missouri, United States
|

See also 
 List of current UFC fighters
 List of male mixed martial artists

References

External links 
  
 

1994 births
Living people
American male mixed martial artists
Middleweight mixed martial artists
Mixed martial artists utilizing wrestling
Ultimate Fighting Championship male fighters
Sportspeople from St. Louis
Mixed martial artists from Missouri